"Can't We Be Friends?" is a 1929 song with lyrics by Paul James and music by Kay Swift, introduced on Broadway in The Little Show by Libby Holman. It was later recorded by many artists including Bing Crosby, Ella Fitzgerald, and Frank Sinatra.

Recordings
Red Nichols & his Five Pennies (recorded 9/6/1929 and released on Brunswick 4510).
Ray Ventura & his Collegians (recorded 10/19/1929)
Smith Ballew (recorded 11/11/1929, and released on Okeh 41304).
The Georgians (recorded 11/22/1929)
Bing Crosby (recorded 9/27/1929, and released on Columbia 2001-D) 
Libby Holman (recorded September, 1929 and released on Brunswick 4506).
Sam Wooding & his Chocolate Kiddies (recorded 12/1929)
The Imperial Dance Orchestra (1929)
Al Bowlly with Ray Noble & his Orchestra (recorded 1/16/1931 and released on Decca F2220) (Al Bowlly Discography)
Frank Sinatra (In the Wee Small Hours album, 1955) (recorded February 8, 1955, with orchestra conducted by Nelson Riddle)
Illinois Jacquet (Swing's the Thing album, 1956)
Gene Ammons (The Happy Blues album, 1956)
Ella Fitzgerald & Louis Armstrong (Ella and Louis album, 1956)
Jane Powell (Can't We Be Friends album, 1956)
Linda Ronstadt (Lush Life album, 1984)
Jamie Cullum (Twentysomething album, 2003)
Seth MacFarlane (Once in a While album, 2019)
Vincent Lopez & his Orchestra
Anita O'Day - included in her album Incomparable! (1960).
Leo Reisman & his Orchestra
Art Tatum

Movie usage
The Man I Love (1947) Played when Joey finds Gloria in the room and Petey sees San at the bar.
Flamingo Road (1949) Played at the Eagle cafe when Lane gets hired 
Backfire (1950) Played when Steve, Bonnie and Lysa arrive at the party
Young Man with a Horn (1950) featured Harry James dubbing "Can't We Be Friends" for Kirk Douglas's character
Starlift (1951) Played twice at the cafeteria 
Bonnie & Clyde (1967) featured a scored version by Charles Strouse in the background of one scene
Torch Song Trilogy (1998) featured Anita O'Day's version
Get Him to the Greek (2010) featured a version by the Pete Jolly Trio

References

See also
List of 1920s jazz standards

Songs about friendship
1929 songs
1920s jazz standards
Bing Crosby songs
Ella Fitzgerald songs
Frank Sinatra songs
Linda Ronstadt songs
Louis Armstrong songs
Songs with music by Kay Swift
Al Bowlly songs